The Institute for Safe Medication Practices (ISMP) is an American 501(c)(3) organization focusing on the prevention of medication errors and promoting safe medication practices. It is affiliated with the ECRI Institute.

Activities 
Among others, ISMP maintains and disseminates a list of "do not crush" medications, as well as clinical best practices. The ISMP's Medication Safety Self-Assessment tool has been used in surveys of medication safety in hospitals in the United States and elsewhere.

The ISMP frequently investigates and reports on medication errors that have occurred in practice. These investigations are often published in the peer-reviewed journal Hospital Pharmacy.

References 

Pharmacology
Drug safety
Patient safety